The women's K-1 200 metres sprint canoeing event at the 2020 Summer Olympics took place on 2 and 3 August 2021 at the Sea Forest Waterway. At least 12 canoeists from at least 12 nations competed.

Background
This was the 3rd appearance of the event, which replaced the men's C-2 500 metres in 2012.

The seven-time reigning World Champion and two-time reigning Olympic champion is Lisa Carrington of New Zealand, who earned a place for her NOC and has been selected to compete.

Qualification

A National Olympic Committee (NOC) could qualify one place in the event, though could enter up to 2 boats if it earned enough quota places through other women's kayak events. A total of 12 qualification places were available, initially allocated as follows:

 5 places awarded through the 2019 ICF Canoe Sprint World Championships
 6 places awarded through continental tournaments, 1 per continent except 2 places for Europe
 1 place awarded through the 2021 Canoe Sprint World Cup Stage 2.

Qualifying places were awarded to the NOC, not to the individual canoeist who earned the place.

An extensive reallocation process was used, resulting in one of the quota places being reallocated to a larger kayak class. Carrington and Jørgensen also qualified in the K-1 500 metres, resulting in their quota spots being reallocated within the 200 metres (Starović could not receive it, as she had also qualified in the 500 metres). Kichasova-Skoryk, however, had qualified in the K-4 but not the K-1 500 metres; her quota was reallocated to the larger boat classes. The 4 remaining World Championships quota places were allocated as follows:

Continental and World Cup places:

Nations with women's kayak quota spots from the K-1 500 metres, K-2 500 metres, or K-4 500 metres could enter (additional) boats as well.

Competition format
Sprint canoeing uses a four-round format for events with at least 11 boats, with heats, quarterfinals, semifinals, and finals. The specifics of the progression format depend on the number of boats ultimately entered.

The course is a flatwater course 9 metres wide. The name of the event describes the particular format within sprint canoeing. The "K" format means a kayak, with the canoeist sitting, using a double-bladed paddle to paddle, and steering with a foot-operated rudder (as opposed to a canoe, with a kneeling canoeist, single-bladed paddle, and no rudder). The "1" is the number of canoeists in each boat. The "200 metres" is the distance of each race.

Schedule
The event was held over two consecutive days, with two rounds per day. All sessions started at 9:30 a.m. local time, though there are multiple events with races in each session.

Results

Heats
Progression System: 1st-2nd to SF, rest to QF.

Heat 1

Heat 2

Heat 3

Heat 4

Heat 5

Quarterfinals 
Progression System: 1st-2nd to SF, rest out.

Quarterfinal 1

Quarterfinal 2

Quarterfinal 3

Semifinals
Progression System: 1st-4th to Final A, rest to Final B.

Semifinal 1

Semifinal 2

Finals

Final A

Final B

References

Women's K-1 200 metres
Women's events at the 2020 Summer Olympics